Little Bradley is a small village and civil parish in the West Suffolk district, in the county of Suffolk, England. According to Eilert Ekwall, the meaning of the village name is "the wide clearing." The Domesday Book records the population of Little Bradley in 1086 (including Great Bradley) to be 57. It lies in the valley of the River Stour, north of Haverhill. The population at the 2011 Census was included in the civil parish of Great Bradley.

The 11th century Church of All Saints is one of 38 existing round-tower churches in Suffolk. It is a grade I listed building.

References

External links

Website with photos of Little Bradley, a round-tower church

Villages in Suffolk
Civil parishes in Suffolk
Borough of St Edmundsbury